Peter Rosenkranz (born 1 July 1953) is a German former swimmer. He competed in two events at the 1972 Summer Olympics.

References

External links
 

1953 births
Living people
German male swimmers
Olympic swimmers of West Germany
Swimmers at the 1972 Summer Olympics
People from Sulzbach-Rosenberg
Sportspeople from the Upper Palatinate